Anne Chabanceau de La Barre (1628–1688) was a French soprano of the baroque era.

She was the daughter of Pierre Chabanceau de La Barre (1592-1656), organist of the chapelle royale at Notre-Dame, sieur of La Barre, and sister of Joseph Chabanceau de La Barre (1633-1678), composers of airs.

Anne made her debut in opera in 1647 in Orfeo by Luigi Rossi. Between 1652 and 1654, she travelled widely in Northern Europe, and sang at the court of Queen Christina of Sweden in Stockholm for some time. She was made kammarsångerska, singer of the royal court in 1653-1654, alongside her brother Joseph (1633–78) who was court singer in 1650-1654. She later appeared at the court of Denmark.

Back in France, she sang in several "comédie-ballets" by Jean-Baptiste Lully such as Galanterie du Temps, Alcidiane, La Raillerie, and Princesse d'Élide. She took part in the creation of Ercole amante by Francesco Cavalli in 1662, during the composer's stay in France.

In 1661, she was named "fille ordinaire de la musique de la Chambre du Roi", meaning roughly a member of the king's private music ensemble (or court soprano), a very prestigious post that she kept until her death. In 1667, she married Antoine Coquerel, and ended her stage career.

References

 L'opéra baroque, les chanteurs de Lully, Jean-Claude Brenac.
 Leif Jonsson, Ann-Marie Nilsson, Greger Andersson: Musiken i Sverige. Från forntiden till stormaktstidens slut 1720 ("Music in Sweden. From Antiquity to the end of the Great power era 1720") (In Swedish)

External links
 Le magazine de l'opéra baroque (French)

French operatic sopranos
Singers from Paris
1628 births
1688 deaths
17th-century French women opera singers
Court of Christina, Queen of Sweden